The Technische Universität Bergakademie Freiberg (abbreviation: TU Bergakademie Freiberg, TUBAF) is a public university of technology with currently 3655 students in the city of Freiberg, Saxony, Germany. Its focuses are on exploration, mining & extraction, processing, and recycling of natural resources & scrap, as well as developing new materials. Today, it's the oldest university of mining and metallurgy in the world.

History

Pre-1945 
The institution was established in 1765, during the Age of Enlightenment, by Prince Francis Xavier of Saxony based on plans by Friedrich Wilhelm von Oppel and Friedrich Anton von Heynitz, at the time it was called the Kurfürstlich-Sächsische Bergakademie zu Freiberg (by 1806: Königlich-Sächsische Bergakademie zu Freiberg). Its main purpose was the education of highly skilled miners and scientists in fields connected to mining and metallurgy. There had developed a need for mining, as an industry to regenerate Saxony's economy, since Saxony had been defeated in the Seven Year's War.

Before the establishment of the Bergakademie (mining school), four similar institutions had been founded in other countries: Potosí, Bolivia (1557–1786); Kongsberg, Norway (1757–1814);  Schemnitz, today's Slovakia (Banská Štiavnica, 1762–1919); and Prague (1762–1772). Since these do not exist anymore, Freiberg University is the oldest and still operational University of Mining and Technology. After the École des Ponts et Chaussées, which was established in 1747, it is also the second oldest institution of higher learning with focus on STEM-research (university of technology).

The chemical elements indium (1863) and germanium (1886) were discovered by scientists of Freiberg University. The polymath Alexander von Humboldt studied mining at the Bergakademie from 1791 to 1792, as did the poet Novalis from 1797 to 1799.

In 1899, it was incorporated as a Technische Hochschule. In 1905, Bergakademie gained the right to grant doctorates in engineering (Dr.-Ing.), and in 1939 for natural sciences (Dr. rer. nat.). In 1940, two novel faculties (divisions) where established: Natural Sciences and Mining & Metallurgy. In 1956, another faculty concerning economy was added.

1945 to 1990 
After World War II, education of future engineers and scientists, as well as research were quickliy re-established in order to (re-) build primary industry in the Soviet Occupation Zone/GDR. The campus and faculty-staff were expanded rapidly. The educational direction changed through establishing novel courses. Also, the student demographics changed (percentage of women increased), since the access to college was directed by central authorities. Additionally, children of "workers & farmers", who traditionally didn't pursued tertiary education, were supported by having a college preparation institute (Arbeiter-und-Bauern-Fakultät (ABF) „Wilhelm Pieck“).

Since 1990 
In the aftermath of German reunification, the infrastructure and academic body were reorganized in order to fit the new political circumstances. After its incorporation into the West German system of higher education, Bergakademie quickly found a prime position as "The University of Resources". As the first East German University, it joined the German Research Foundation. In connection, the social sciences section were eliminated, while a faculty for economics was restructured and expanded to 15 professorships.

One of the emerging focus points in research was semiconductors, which led to corporations settling in and around Freiberg. These include Siltronic AG, Meyer Burger Technology AG, and JT Energy Systems, specializing in semiconductors, solar power, and lithium-ion batteries, respectively. Besides geo- and materials sciences, environmental science became a university strong point.

In March 1993, then Technische Hochschule Bergakademie Freiberg was renamed Technische Universität Bergakademie Freiberg, underlining its increased status and significance.

Today, TUBAF is a modern & environmentally focused university, internationally recognized as a "university of closed resource cycles".

The university's history is presented in the Historicum through numerous exhibits, paintings and photographs, and documents. The Forum for Mining History (Forum Montangeschichte) is responsible for digitizing and publishing historic essays and publications concerning Saxony's historical mining and metallurgical industry.

Historical figures and scientific achievements 
A number of known figures studied and/or lectured at the Bergakademie:

Abraham Gottlob Werner (1749–1817) was a highly influential lecturer and scientist, who systematized minerals and rock formations. He is considered the founder of an early form of geology as a science, called 'geognosis'. Thus, he laid the foundation for mineralogy and resource deposit theory. During his tenure, he attracted a wide range of students and peers, among them Alexander von Humboldt, Franz Xaver von Baader, Leopold von Buch, Friedrich Mohs, and Robert Jameson.

Wilhelm August Lampadius (1772–1842) was a professor of chemistry and metallurgy. He installed the first gas light on the European continent and advanced the technology to an industrial scale. Also, Lampadius founded the world's first chemical research laboratory in a university in 1796/97.

The poet Novalis (1772–1801; Georg Philipp Friedrich von Hardenberg) studied in Freiberg from 1797 through 1799. He also created his pseudonym for his literary works during this time. Many topics and themes of his work came from the mining culture surrounding him.

The polymath Alexander von Humboldt enrolled on 14 June 1791 and went through a rather short, but intense program, qualifying him in natural sciences and metallurgy. He took a special interest in developing appliances, such as the "Licht-Erhalter". One of Humboldt's most famous discoveries was the vegetation underground, published in 1793 as "Flora Fribergensis". Many of the plants described were discovered and characterized by him.

In 1863, the chemical element indium was discovered by chemist Hieronymus Theodor Richter (1824–1898) and physicist Ferdinand Reich (1799–1882), naming it after its indigo-blue colored flame.

In 1886, chemistry professor Clemens Alexander Winkler (1838–1904) isolated the element germanium for the first time while analyzing the rather uncommon mineral argyrodite. This proved Dmitri Mendeleev's periodic table and his prediction of a so-called ekasilicon.

In the field of process engineering, Erich Rammler and Georg Bilkenroth were awarded the National Prize of the German Democratic Republic (1st class) for their work on lignite coke & coal gasification in 1951.

Profile 
The university has defined core fields that create a unique profile in education and research:

Geo 
Exploring, researching, and (resourceful) use of the system Earth is the focal point of TUBAF's geosciences. The work is based on innovative and novel technologies, e.g. for finding resources, extracting them without unnecessary destruction, and resourceful processing.

Materials 
Innovative materials for today's problems and uses are being developed. This includes the making, as well as recycling of these materials.

Energy 
In this field, scientists develop new, green solutions to energy problems. Production, use, and storage of energy are researched in conjunction. Additionally, digitisation of the energy sector is another topic.

Environment 
Environmental sciences focus on safety and conservation aspects, e.g. of drinking water, as well as on processes in the primary and energy industry.

Technology 
Engineers work on future-oriented solutions, novel products, and optimization of already existing processes & methods. Their studies include applied research as well as foundational questions.

Economics 
Economic topics arise from all of the fields mentioned above. Therefore, researchers in this field work on projects in pure economic disciplines and interdisciplinary projects alike.

Programs

The university offers programs taught in German, as well as international programs entirely taught in English. All in all, there are 75 programs. Among those are unique ones, such as Applied Natural Sciences, Industrial Archeology, Mine-Surveying, and Chemistry (Diplom), which are taught in German.

Admission to all programs from Bachelor through Ph.D. is performance-based and without tuition fees (as usual for consecutive studies at German public universities); students pay a registration fee of 94€ per semester, of which 7€ is dedicated solely to the Student Body (Council).

13 masters programs (date: WS 2022/23) are taught in English:

 Advanced Materials Analysis (AMA)
 Advanced Mineral Resource Development (AMRD)
 Computational Materials Science (CMS)
 EMerald master in Resources Engineering (EMerald)
 Geomatics for Mineral Resource Management
 Geoscience
 Groundwater Management
 International Business and Resources in Emerging Markets (IBRE)
 Mathematics for Data and Resource Sciences
 Mechanical and Process Engineering (MPE)
 Metallic Materials Technology (MMT)
 Sustainable Mining and Remediation Management (MoRe)
 Sustainable and Innovative Natural Resource Management (SINReM)
 Technology and Application of Inorganic Engineering Materials (TAIEM)

Freiberg University of Mining and Technology has been ranked among the best universities worldwide for mining engineering.

Though a public university, it has a relatively large private endowment. The university is home to one of the largest German university foundations.

Student body
Freiberg is a highly international university. Among its 4,061 students in 2018, 24% were foreign students. There are double degree agreements with universities in China, France, Ghana, Italy, Poland, Russia, Thailand, and others. About 30% of the doctoral degrees awarded by the university are given to foreign students.

Notable alumni 
Luo Gan, former Member of the Politburo Standing Committee of the Chinese Communist Party.
Mary Hegeler Carus – the first woman to legally enroll (in 1885).
Edward Renouf, chemistry professor, Johns Hopkins University.
Alexander von Humboldt, renowned naturalist, historian, and humanitarian

International University Rankings 
The 2021 QS World University Rankings by subject rated TU Bergakademie Freiberg No. 17 for Mineral and Mining worldwide and No. 3 in Europe. The Center for World University Rankings (CWUR) ranked TU Freiberg 64th among German universities on research performance.

References

External links
  

 
Schools of mines
Educational institutions established in 1765
1765 establishments in the Holy Roman Empire
Freiberg
Mining in the Ore Mountains
Universities and colleges in Saxony